Kalvin may refer to:

 People

 Kalvin McRae (born 1985), American football player
 Kalvin Pearson (born 1978), American football player
 Kalvin Phillips (born 1995), English footballer

 Places

 Kálvin tér, Budapest square